

The Nashville Sounds Minor League Baseball team has played in Nashville, Tennessee, since its establishment in 1978. Through the completion of the 2022 season, 1,425 players have competed in at least one regular-season game for the Sounds. Of those, 1,015 have also played in at least one game for a Major League Baseball (MLB) team. Seven additional players have appeared for the Sounds only in postseason games, two of whom have also played in the majors. Encompassing both regular and postseason play, 1,432 players have competed for Nashville; 1,017 of those have also played in Major League Baseball.

Created as an expansion team of the Double-A Southern League in 1978, the Sounds played in this league through 1984. At the Double-A classification, Nashville was affiliated with Major League Baseball's Cincinnati Reds (1978–1979) and New York Yankees (1980–1984). The Sounds moved up to Triple-A in 1985 as members of the American Association before joining the Pacific Coast League in 1998. With the restructuring of the minor leagues in 2021, they were placed in the Triple-A East, which became the International League in 2022. At this level, they have been affiliates of the Detroit Tigers (1985–1986), Cincinnati Reds (1987–1992), Chicago White Sox (1993–1997), Pittsburgh Pirates (1998–2004), Milwaukee Brewers (2005–2014), Oakland Athletics (2015–2018), and Texas Rangers (2019–2020). The Sounds reaffiliated with the Milwaukee Brewers in 2021.

Eighty of the team's players have distinguished themselves after their playing time with Nashville by winning a Major League Baseball award, being named to a major league All-Star team, or being elected to the National Baseball Hall of Fame. Ryan Braun, Barry Larkin, Don Mattingly, and Willie McGee have won Most Valuable Player (MVP) Awards. Doug Drabek and R. A. Dickey have won the Cy Young Award. Jason Bay, Ryan Braun, and Chris Sabo have won Rookie of the Year Awards. Don Mattingly, Bob Melvin, and Buck Showalter have won the Manager of the Year Award. Prince Fielder and Aramis Ramírez have won Hank Aaron Awards. Nelson Cruz and Khris Davis have won the Edgar Martínez Award. John Axford, Keith Foulke, Trevor Hoffman, and Jeff Montgomery won Rolaids Relief Man Awards. Liam Hendriks won the Reliever of the Year Award. Prince Fielder won the Comeback Player of the Year Award. Lorenzo Cain, Nelson Cruz, Rob Dibble, and Alcides Escobar have won League Championship Series MVP Awards. José Rijo and Ben Zobrist have won the World Series MVP Award. Nelson Cruz and Barry Larkin have won the Roberto Clemente Award. Nineteen alumni have won a Rawlings Gold Glove Award; five have won Wilson Defensive Player of the Year Awards, including Matt Chapman as the Wilson Overall Defensive Player of the Year; and fourteen have won a Silver Slugger Award. Seventy-two former players have been selected to play in the Major League Baseball All-Star Game, including Prince Fielder as an All-Star Game MVP. Four players have been selected for All-MLB Teams. Trevor Hoffman, Barry Larkin, and Tim Raines have been elected to the National Baseball Hall of Fame.

Players

Notes
Table keys

MLB award winners and All-Stars

References
Specific

General

All-time roster